The Hamilton Spectator, founded in 1846, is a newspaper published weekdays and Saturdays in Hamilton, Ontario, Canada. One of the largest Canadian newspapers by circulation,The Hamilton Spectator is owned by Torstar.

History

The Hamilton Spectator was first published July 15, 1846, as The Hamilton Spectator and Journal of Commerce. Founded by Robert Smiley and a partner, the paper was sold in 1877 to William Southam, who founded the Southam newspaper chain and made the Spectator the first of the chain. The Southam chain was sold in 1998 to Conrad Black, who in turn sold off The Hamilton Spectator to Toronto-based Sun Media. In 1999, the Spectator was sold for a third time to Torstar Corporation. On May 26, 2020, its parent company, Torstar, agreed to be acquired by NordStar Capital, a private investment firm. The deal was expected to close by year end.

Publication
The Hamilton Spectator is published six days a week by Metroland Media Group, a division of Torstar. It serves Hamilton, Burlington and the Niagara region. It also serves Brant County and Haldimand County towns such as Caledonia, Hagersville and Dunnville. The Spectator also serves Halton Region, as far east as Oakville.

See also
List of newspapers in Canada
List of newspapers in Canada by circulation
Hamilton Spectator Trophy

References

External links
 Hamilton Spectator official website
 Democracy at War: Canadian Newspapers and the Second World War - Canadian Museum of Civilization

Publications established in 1846
Newspapers published in Hamilton, Ontario
Torstar publications
Daily newspapers published in Ontario
1846 establishments in Canada